Samuel Fowler (March 22, 1851 in Port Jervis, New York – March 17, 1919 in Newark, New Jersey) was an American Democratic Party politician who represented New Jersey's 4th congressional district in the U.S. representative for two terms from 1889 to 1893.

Early life and education
Fowler was the son of Colonel Samuel Fowler (1818–1863), an officer with the 15th New Jersey Volunteer Infantry Regiment during the American Civil War, and grandson of Samuel Fowler (1779–1844), who served in the House of Representatives from 1833 to 1837.

Fowler was born in Port Jervis, New York on March 22, 1851. He attended the Newton (N.J.) Academy, Princeton College, and Columbia Law School in New York City. He was admitted to the bar of New York in 1873 and of New Jersey in 1876 and practiced law in Newark and Newton, New Jersey.

Congress
Fowler was elected as a Democrat to the Fifty-first and Fifty-second Congresses, and served in office from March 4, 1889 to March 3, 1893, and was chairman of the Committee on Merchant Marine and Fisheries (Fifty-second Congress). He was not a candidate for reelection to the Fifty-third Congress.

Later life and death
After leaving Congress, he resumed the practice of his profession in Ogdensburg, New Jersey.

Fowler died in Newark on March 17, 1919. He was interred in North Church Cemetery in Hardyston Township, near Hamburg, New Jersey.

References

Samuel Fowler at The Political Graveyard

1851 births
1919 deaths
Columbia Law School alumni
New Jersey lawyers
New York (state) lawyers
Democratic Party members of the United States House of Representatives from New Jersey
People from Port Jervis, New York
People from Sussex County, New Jersey
Princeton University alumni
19th-century American politicians
19th-century American lawyers